Become What You Believe is a 2006 album by Last Tuesday. It was originally released on August 15, 2006. The label was produced by Mono Vs Stereo.

Track listing
 Become What You Believe 
 This Is the Way
 1999
 Deal with It
 Carry On
 Wake Me Up
 Can You Hear Me?
 Stand, The
 Giving Up
 My Last Regret

References

2006 albums
Last Tuesday albums
Mono vs Stereo albums